The 1942 Massachusetts gubernatorial election was held on November 3, 1942. Republican incumbent Leverett Saltonstall defeated Democrat Roger Putnam, Communist candidate Otis A. Hood, Socialist candidate Joseph Massidda, Socialist Labor candidate Henning A. Blomen, and Prohibition candidate Guy S. Williams.

Primary
Springfield Mayor Roger Putnam defeated former Lieutenant Governor Francis E. Kelly for the Democratic nomination.

General election

See also
 1941–1942 Massachusetts legislature

References

Governor
1942
Massachusetts governor
November 1942 events